John Proby, 2nd Earl of Carysfort (1780 – 11 June 1855), known as Lord Proby from 1804 to 1828, was a British military commander and Whig politician.

Proby was the second but eldest surviving son of John Proby, 1st Earl of Carysfort, and his wife Elizabeth (née Osbourne), and was educated at Rugby. He gained the courtesy title of Lord Proby when his elder brother died in 1804. He succeeded his father in 1828, inheriting Elton Hall in Huntingdonshire (now in Cambridgeshire).

He was commissioned into the British Army in 1794 and fought in the French Revolutionary Wars. Carysfort was promoted to major-general in 1814, and in that year took part in the ill-fated attack on Bergen op Zoom in the Netherlands. He was promoted to lieutenant-general in 1830 and to general in 1846.

Apart from his military career he also represented Buckingham in the House of Commons from 1805 to 1806 and Huntingdonshire from 1806 to 1807 and again from 1814 to 1818.

Lord Carysfort died in June 1855. He never married and was succeeded in the earldom by his younger brother Granville.

Notes

References

External links 
 

1780 births
1855 deaths
British Army generals
British Army personnel of the French Revolutionary Wars
British Army personnel of the Napoleonic Wars
Whig (British political party) MPs for English constituencies
Members of the Parliament of the United Kingdom for English constituencies
People educated at Rugby School
UK MPs 1802–1806
UK MPs 1806–1807
UK MPs 1812–1818
Carysfort, E2
Earls of Carysfort